A pentagraph (from the , pénte, "five" and γράφω, gráphō, "write") is a sequence of five letters used to represent a single sound (phoneme), or a combination of sounds, that do not correspond to the individual values of the letters. In German, for example, the pentagraph tzsch represents the  sound of the English digraph ch, and indeed is found in the English word Nietzschean. Irish has several pentagraphs.

Latin-script pentagraphs
For Latin-script pentagraphs see List of Latin-script pentagraphs.

Cyrillic-script pentagraphs
In Cyrillic used for languages of the Caucasus, there are a couple five-letter sequences used for 'strong' (typically transcribed in the IPA as geminate, and doubled in Cyrillic) labialized consonants. Since both features are predictable from the orthography, their pentagraph status is dubious.

It occurs, for example, in an Archi word ххьIвелтIбос meaning rummage through someone else's things.

See also
Trigraph
Tetragraph
Hexagraph
Heptagraph

References

5